Zherizhah Rural District is a rural district (dehestan) in the Central District of Sarvabad County, Kurdistan Province, Iran. At the 2006 census, its population was 5,380, in 1,275 families. The rural district has 17 villages.

References 

Rural Districts of Kurdistan Province
Sarvabad County